The siege of Isfahan was a siege of the city of Isfahan by the army of Timur in 1387.

Background
To annex the Muzaffarid kingdom Timur would have to capture its two main cities: Isfahan and Shiraz. When in 1387, Timur arrived with his army to Isfahan, It immediately surrendered and so he treated it with relative mercy as he normally did with cities that surrendered.

Siege
Soon after, Isfahan revolted against Timur's taxes by killing the tax collectors and some of Timur's soldiers. Timur laid siege to the city and recaptured it with little effort.

Massacre of citizens
After restoring his control over the city he ordered the massacre of the citizens who resisted; the death toll is reckoned to be at least 70,000. An eye-witness counted more than 28 towers constructed of about 1,500 heads each. This has been described as a "systematic use of terror against towns...an integral element of Tamerlane's strategic element" which he viewed as preventing bloodshed by discouraging resistance. His massacres were selective and he spared those who were artistic and educated. This would later influence the next great Turkic conqueror: Nader Shah.

Aftermath
After the massacre Isfahan remained loyal to Timur and so he went to capture Shiraz. Unlike the events which occurred after the Siege of Herat Timur did not destroy any of the buildings and architecture allowing it retain its importance and influence in Persia.

References

Isfahan
Isfahan
1387 in Asia
Isfahan
1380s in the Middle East
Isfahan